Thomas Blatherwick was  a rugby union international who represented England in 1878.

Early life
Thomas Blatherwick was born on 25 December 1855 in Quebec. He attended Epsom College.

Rugby union career
Blatherwick made his international debut and only appearance for England on 11 March 1878 in the match against Ireland match at Lansdowne Road.
In the only match he played for his national side he was on the winning side.

References

1855 births
1940 deaths
English rugby union players
England international rugby union players
Rugby union forwards
People educated at Epsom College